Lumina Desktop Environment, or simply Lumina, is a plugin-based desktop environment for Unix and Unix-like operating systems. It is designed specifically as a system interface for TrueOS, and systems derived from Berkeley Software Distribution (BSD) in general, but has been ported to various Linux distributions.

History
Created in 2012 by Ken Moore, Lumina was initially a set of extensions to Fluxbox, a stacking window manager for the X Window System. By late 2013, Moore had developed a graphical overlay for Fluxbox based on Qt4, and had created a utility for "launching applications and opening files". The codebase was integrated into the PC-BSD source repository by early 2014, and a port was added to the FreeBSD Ports collection in April 2014. The source code has since been moved to a separate GitHub repository "under the PC-BSD umbrella" and converted to use Qt5. Development also focused on replacing the Fluxbox core with a Qt-based window manager integrated with the Lumina desktop.

The project avoids use of Linux-based tools or frameworks, such as D-Bus, Polkit, and systemd.

Features
The desktop and application menus are dynamically configured upon first being launched, as the desktop environment finds installed applications automatically to add to the menu and as a desktop icon. The default panel includes a Start menu, task manager, and system tray, and its location can be customized. Menus may be accessed via the Start menu or by right-clicking the mouse on the desktop background.

Some features are specific to TrueOS, including hardware control of screen brightness (monitor backlight), preventing shutdown of an updating system, and integration with various TrueOS utilities.

Utilities include: Insight, a file manager; File information, which reports a file's format and other details; and Lumina Open, a graphical utility to launch applications based on the selected file or folder.

Version 1.4 included several new utilities. The PDF reader lumina-pdf is based on the poppler library. The Lumina Theme Engine replaced an earlier theme system; it enables a user to configure the desktop appearance and functionality, and ensures all Qt5 applications "present a unified appearance".

Ports
Lumina has been ported to various BSD operating systems and Linux distributions. These include:

Berkeley Software Distribution
TrueOS
DragonFly BSD
FreeBSD
NetBSD
OpenBSD
kFreeBSD
Linux distributions
antiX Linux
Arch Linux
Debian
Fedora 24
Gentoo Linux
Manjaro Linux
NixOS
PCLinuxOS
Void Linux

Notes

References

External links
Lumina Desktop Environment

Free desktop environments